The swimming competition during the 1997 Summer Universiade, also known as the XIX Summer Universiade, was a long course event (50 m), and took place in Messina, on the island of Sicily, Italy from August 24 till August 30, 1997.



Men's events

Women's events

References
 Results on FISU-site
 swimrankings

Swimming at the Summer Universiade
Uni
1997 Summer Universiade
Sports competitions in Messina